The Old Port (sometimes known as the Old Port Exchange) is a district of Portland, Maine, known for its cobblestone streets, 19th-century brick buildings and fishing piers.  The district is filled with boutiques, restaurants and bars. Because of its reputation for nightlife, the Old Port is a popular destination for tourists and locals alike.

Geography
The Old Port district is located on the southeast side of the Portland peninsula, overlooking the wide mouth of the Fore River and the Port of Portland.  It is bounded on the east by Franklin Street (United States Route 1A), with Commercial Street southwest along the waterfront, with 19th century buildings on its north side as far west as Maple Street.  It extends inland as far as Federal Street, between Pearl and Temple Streets, with Fore and Middle Streets as major cross streets that very roughly parallel the waterfront.  The shore area on the southeast side of commercial street is lined with wharves. It is bordered by the neighborhoods of Bayside, East Bayside, Munjoy Hill and the West End.

A large portion of this area has been designated a historic district, and is listed on the National Register of Historic Places as the "Portland Waterfront Historic District".

Parks 
The Old Port includes the adjacent parks of Post Office Park and Tommy's Park, which features a large mural. Bell Buoy Park is located next to the Casco Bay Ferry Terminal. The Eastern Promenade Trail terminates in the Old Port and connects to the East End Beach.

History
The Portland peninsula was first settled in the 17th century, but was abandoned during the French and Indian Wars of the late 17th and early 18th centuries.  It was resettled, and incorporated as Falmouth in 1718.  It prospered economically in the 18th century due to the lumber trade, particularly the trade in virgin trees used as ship masts.  At the outbreak of the American Revolutionary War, a large part of the city was destroyed by fire in a British raid in October 1775.  The city rebuilt, and again became a major shipping center and Maine's leading port and economic center.  Commercial Street was created by fill in the 1850s, and Middle and Exchanges Street area developed as a major commercial district.  In 1866 a major fire swept through the area, bringing on a wave of new construction.

Historically, Exchange Street was where many printers and newspapers were located. At the top of Exchange Street, strategically located across Congress Street from Portland City Hall, is the Press Herald Building built in 1923 and expanded in 1948 as the headquarters of the Portland Press Herald. In 2015, the renovated building became the Press Hotel.

The Old Port was transformed in the 1970s when real estate developers purchased derelict buildings and refurbished them into apartments, condos, offices and retail space. A new group of restaurants emerged that included The Hollow Reed on Fore Street that are cited for influencing the city's current restaurant culture. During that same decade, the Old Port Association formed and helped halt the city's demolition of historic buildings (see: Portland (Maine) Union Station) and lobbied for street scape improvements. The Cumberland County Civic Center was built at the top of the Old Port in 1977. In the early 1980s, Congress passed the Economic Recovery Tax Act, which provided tax incentives for redevelopment projects, and spurred further development in the district.

In 2006, construction began on the Ocean Gateway project. The Ocean Gateway serves as the city's cruise ship terminal.

Old Port Festival
The Old Port Festival was a yearly one-day festival which took place in the neighborhood. For the first 36 years (1973-2009), it took place on the first Sunday in June. However, noting weather patterns which consistently brought rain storms on that day, organizers moved the Festival to the second Sunday in June 2010, avoiding heavy rain. In 2009, Festival organizers sought to create the world's largest lobster roll as part of the festival. It included 48 pounds of lobster meat and 4 gallons of mayonnaise. It measured 61 feet and 9.5 inches long. Pieces of the roll were sold to benefit a youth association. In 1998, the event included children games, including a petting zoo and miniature golf. In June 2019, the final Old Port Festival occurred, though some area business owners sought to continue the event.

See also
Exchange Street (Maine)
National Register of Historic Places listings in Portland, Maine

References

External links
Portland Downtown District
Portland Old Port Nightlife

Entertainment districts in the United States
Neighborhoods in Portland, Maine
Redeveloped ports and waterfronts in the United States
Historic districts on the National Register of Historic Places in Maine
National Register of Historic Places in Portland, Maine